Boris Diecket (born 31 January 1963) is an Ivorian footballer. He played in one match for the Ivory Coast national football team in 1988. He was also named in the Ivory Coast's squad for the 1986 African Cup of Nations tournament.

References

External links
 

1963 births
Living people
Ivorian footballers
Ivory Coast international footballers
1986 African Cup of Nations players
Footballers from Abidjan
Association football midfielders
Ivorian expatriate footballers
Expatriate footballers in France
Angers SCO players
Tours FC players
FC Nantes players
Red Star F.C. players
USL Dunkerque players
ES Viry-Châtillon players